Spissrotgang (English: Run The Gauntlet) is the eighth album by the Norwegian country group Hellbillies. The album was released on October 15, 2007 through EMI Records Norway. To date, it has sold over 35,000 copies in Norway.

Track listing

Credits 
Aslag Haugen - Vocals, Acoustic Guitar
Lars Håvard Haugen - Guitar, Mandolin, Steel Guitar [Pedal], Backing Vocals
Arne Sandum - Bass
Arne Moslåtten  - Flute, Accordion
Bjørn Gunnar Sando - Drums
Kyrre Sætran - Bass
Lars Christian Narum - Organ, Piano, Electric Piano [Wurlitzer], Keyboards [Harmonium], Mellotron
Trond Nagell Dahl - Backing Vocals (Livsfarleg Leik)
Tove Margrethe Erikstad - Cello (Gamle Spor)
Trond Augland - Percussion
Cammilla Kjøll - Viola (Gamle Spor)
Lina Årnes - Violin (Gamle Spor)
Lise Sørensen - (Gamle Spor)
Hilde Heltberg - Vocals (Gamle Spor, Ukjend By, Drukne Ei Gudinne)

References 

Hellbillies albums
2007 albums